Saturn Club is a private social club, founded in 1885, in Buffalo in Erie County, New York that currently operates out of an National Register of Historic Places-listed building at 977 Delaware Ave. in Buffalo, New York.

History
In 1885, The Saturn Club was founded by thirteen young men who wanted to congregate in a less formal setting than their father's traditional clubs. The first three founders were: Carlton Sprague, William F. Kip, and Francis Almy. They recruited the ten others including John B. Olmsted and Ansley Wilcox. They first congregated on Saturdays, hence the name, to socialize and play cards. Dues were  a month, and the initiation fee was a chair.  With a nod to the many "University Clubs" of the time, Saturn's founders patterned their board of directors after that of a small college, including:
Faculty
Dean
Registrar
Bursar

Initially, the members met in a house owned by Sprague's grandfather but by 1886, the members decided to rent three rooms at the rear of a dwelling at 640 Main Street. In 1887, they moved to another rented house, a small Second Empire style home at 331 Delaware Avenue, before relocating to a larger, Italianate cottage at 393 Delaware Avenue, opposite the Buffalo Club.

In 1889, the club and its 150 members formally incorporated in Erie County and decided to construct their own building. By February, the directors had purchased a lot, 417 Delaware Avenue, at the southeast corner of Delaware Avenue and Edward Streets, not far from the Buffalo Club. On this site, they constructed a three-story brick building, designed by Herbert C Burdett of the Buffalo firm of Marling & Burdett. The building was dedicated on December 13, 1890.

Beginning in the 1890s, the club added baseball games, lectures, costume balls, and vaudeville shows to the club's programming. A library was initiated and debates were held on the important issues of the time. These debates often included participation with other area clubs, including the Buffalo Club, the University Club, and the Garret Club.

In 1900, then Gov. Theodore Roosevelt visited and had dinner at the club during his visit to Buffalo.

In 1985, women were officially admitted as full members, however, in the immediate years preceding the change, women had full use of the club, through a relationship with the Garret Club, as well as through their spouses or other connections.

1922 building
In December 1920, only 30 years after the original buildings dedication, a new building committee suggested selling the existing clubhouse and erecting a new building elsewhere. Club member Duane Lyman, of Bley & Lyman, was asked to develop new plans for a clubhouse along with Ralph Plumb, a club member. The club purchased property at 977 Delaware Avenue and approved Lyman's plans for the present day Tudor style building, by February 1921.

On October 21, 1921, the cornerstone of the new building was laid and exactly one year later, on October 21, 1922, the clubhouse was dedicated.  The Tudor Revival structure featured an enclosed open courtyard. By completion, the project ended up totaling .

The building was listed on the National Register of Historic Places in 2005.

Renovations
In 2002, the club underwent a $1 million renovation that added two squash courts as well as general upgrades to its athletic facilities.  The Saturn Club already had one international regulation doubles court and two singles courts. The new courts allow the club to host competitions.  The other renovation work includes improvements to both the men's and women's locker rooms and the addition of exercise equipment. Hamilton Houston Lownie Architects, PC designed the additions and Integrated Realty & Development Corp. served as construction manager.

In 2014, the interior was remodeled by Michael Donnelly Interiors and focused on two rooms: The Delaware Room and The Red Room. The Red Room features a fireplace  and is accented by dark wood paneling along with a rich red covering. Panel draperies with 12-inch-wide, red fabric bands were added to frame the leaded windows.  New furniture, chandelier covers and brown paisley carpeting with a red background were also added. The Delaware Room has a more clean look showcasing the oversized historic wall panels that depict seaside life. The fabrics are striped with blues and beiges that are intended to complement the murals.

Prohibition
During the early years of Prohibition, Saturn had a bar and a bartender, but did not provide drinks. On advice from its lawyers, members could keep items, unquestioned, in private lockers and order all the ingredients for a drink, without spirits, to be passed into the club's rooms through a small sliding door.

On August 29, 1923, Federal agents under William J. Donovan, who himself was a member of the club, raided both the Saturn Club and the Country Club of Buffalo.  Agents found at least sixty quarts of whisky, a similar amount of gin, five gallons of moonshine, bottles of champagne, vermouth, and other liquors inside the organization's lockers, according to court documents.  The chair of the club's house committee told reporters the night of the raid that the liquor “evidently was smuggled in by bootlegging employees of the club.”

A listing of those charged with dry law violations was published in the newspaper  After the names were published, the members and the club had little option but to agree to a settlement and do away with the sliding doors.

Notable members
Notable former members of Saturn Club include:

Robert B. Adam, founder of AM&A's department store
John J. Albright, industrialist, philanthropist, and namesake of the Albright Knox Art Gallery
Owen Augspurger, civic leader
George K. Birge, owner of M. H. Birge & Sons Co., director of the 1901 Pan-American Exposition, and president of Pierce-Arrow Motor Car Company
Lawrence Bell, aerospace entrepreneur, founder of Bell Aircraft
Edward H. Butler, Jr., publisher of the Buffalo Evening News
Stephen Merrell Clement, president of Marine Bank
William J. Conners II, publisher of the Buffalo Courier-Express
William J. Conners III, publisher of the Buffalo Courier-Express
William J. Donovan, soldier, lawyer, intelligence officer and diplomat
Robert Donner, Donner Steel Company
John T. Elfvin, federal judge
E.B. Green, Jr., architect
George A. Forman ■
Burt P. Flickinger, Jr., entrepreneur, philanthropist, organizer of the 1993 World University Games
William A. Gardner ■
Bradley J. Gaylord ■
Anson Goodyear, founder and first president of the Museum of Modern Art, president of Great Southern Lumber, director of Paramount Pictures
Charles W. Goodyear, founder and head of numerous rail lines 
George F. Goodyear, board president of the Buffalo Museum of Science, founder of WGRZ-TV, Saturn Club historian
William B. Hoyt, politician
Thomas B. Lockwood, candidate for Lt. Governor in 1914
Duane Lyman, architect ■
Edward A Kent, owner of Flint & Kent
Irvine J. Kittinger, Jr., proprietor of the Kittinger Company
Northrup R. Knox, co-founder of the Buffalo Sabres
Seymour H. Knox, businessman ■
Seymour H. Knox III, co-founder of the Buffalo Sabres
Dr. Baldwin Mann ■
Edward McGinley III, Wharton graduate
John R. Oishei, founder of Trico
John Olmsted, landscape architect, nephew and adopted son of Frederick Law Olmsted
Roswell Park, founder of Roswell Park Comprehensive Cancer Center
Ralph Plumb ■
Theodore M. Pomeroy ■
Peter A. Porter, Jr. ■
Ansley Wilcox Sawyer, industrialist ■
George F. Rand, president of Marine Midland Bank
Ira G. Ross, scientist, engineer, leader of Calspan
Dexter P. Rumsey, tannery owner, real estate entrepreneur
William G. Schoellkopf ■
Ralph H. Sidway ■
Frank St. John Sidway, lawyer and National Guard leader and candidate for Lt. Governor in 1914
John E. Selkirk ■
Clarence Sidway ■
Carlton Sprague, lawyer, politician, and chancellor of the University of Buffalo
Harlan J. Swift, president of Erie County Savings Bank
George P. Urban, miller, entrepreneur and director of numerous Buffalo corporations
Henry Z. Urban, publisher of the Buffalo News
James D. Warren, publisher of the Buffalo Commercial Advertiser
Shelton Weed ■
Ansley Wilcox, scholar, Oxford graduate, lawyer, and civil service reform commissioner
Harry D. Williams ■
Seymour White ■

■ Indicates that the individual was named in the newspaper during the 1923 raid

References

External links

 Saturn Club - U.S. National Register of Historic Places on Waymarking.com
 Saturn Club, Buffalo as an Architectural Museum website

Clubhouses on the National Register of Historic Places in New York (state)
Buildings and structures completed in 1922
Buildings and structures in Buffalo, New York
National Register of Historic Places in Buffalo, New York